Ahmed Muhsin (born 1984) is a Lebanese writer. He studied economics at Beirut Arab University, and has since worked as a journalist for various Lebanese newspapers. His first book The Maker of Games was longlisted for the Sheikh Zayed Book Award in 2014-15, while his second novel Warsaw a Little While Ago was nominated for the Arabic Booker Prize.

References

1984 births
Living people
Lebanese writers
Place of birth missing (living people)
Date of birth missing (living people)
Beirut Arab University alumni